Yoder is a surname originating in Switzerland. It may also refer to:

People with the surname
 Ashley Yoder (born 1987), American mixed martial artist
 Brad Yoder (musician), American musician
 Carlin Yoder, American politician
 Jeremy Yoder, American biologist and LGBT advocate
 John C. Yoder (1951–2017), American judge and politician
 John Howard Yoder (1927–2007), American Mennonite theologian, pacifist, and Biblical scholar
 Joseph Yoder (1872–1956), American educator, musicologist, and writer
 Kevin Yoder (born 1976), American politician 
 Samuel S. Yoder, (1841–1921), American politician 
 Shelli Yoder (born 1968), American politician 
 Steve Yoder (born c. 1939), American basketball coach
 Todd Yoder (born 1978), American football player
 Walt Yoder (1914–1978), American jazz bassist

Places
Places in the United States:
Yoder, Colorado
Yoder, Indiana
Yoder, Kansas
Yoder, Oregon
Lower Yoder Township, Pennsylvania
Upper Yoder Township, Pennsylvania
Yoder, Wyoming
Places in Canada:
Yoder, British Columbia

See also
Wisconsin v. Yoder, a landmark United States Supreme Court case
Yoda, a character in Star Wars